Hofton and Son are a British construction company founded in 1846 which for most of its period of operation has been based in Beeston, Nottingham.

History
The business started in 1846 with Levi Hofton (1816 - 1870) who operated as a joiner and undertaker in Beeston, Nottingham. His son Robert Gamble Hofton (1848 - 1912) succeeded him in the business and the business moved into general building contracting. Robert's son Henry Robert Hofton (1875 - 1954) followed his father into the business.

Henry Robert Hofton was also the architect for many of the domestic properties that the business constructed.

Initially Henry Robert Hofton was joined in the business by his son Henry Rex Hofton, but Henry Rex died in 1931 at the age of 27. Henry Robert was later joined by his other son Harold and (John) Richard Shoulder as co-directors and in 1936 the business changed its name from H.R. Hofton and Sons to Hofton and Son Limited and was incorporated on May 27, 1936.

Works
The company has been responsible for the construction of a significant amount of domestic properties in Beeston, Nottinghamshire, and also further afield. It has also constructed a number of significant local business and other properties, including:
Barton House, High Road, Chilwell 1934 (architect Henry Hardwick Dawson)
Beeston Town Hall, 1937-38  (architect Evans, Clark and Woollatt)
West Bridgford Library 1938-39 (architect E.W. Roberts)
Houses and apartments, 8-18A Regent Street, Beeston, Nottingham 2015
10 Houses, Roberts' Yard, Beeston, Nottingham 2017

References

British companies established in 1846
Companies based in Nottinghamshire
Beeston, Nottinghamshire